Albrecht Altma (23 March 1897 Palmse Parish – 8 May 1969 Tallinn) was an Estonian physicist.

In 1927, he graduated from University of Tartu in physics. In 1938, he defended his doctoral thesis at Ludwig Maximilian University of Munich.

1944–1948, he was the rector of Tallinn Polytechnical Institute.

References

1897 births
1969 deaths
20th-century Estonian physicists
University of Tartu alumni
Ludwig Maximilian University of Munich alumni
Academic staff of the Tallinn University of Technology
Rectors of universities in Estonia
People from Haljala Parish